T. Stephen Trainer was a Scottish professional association footballer who played as an outside right. Born in Coatbridge, he made three appearances in the Football League Second Division for Burnley in the 1906–07 season. He later played in the Scottish Football League for hometown club Albion Rovers, operating as a right back.

References

Footballers from Coatbridge
Scottish footballers
Association football outside forwards
Association football defenders
Burnley F.C. players
Albion Rovers F.C. players
English Football League players
Scottish Football League players
Year of death missing
Year of birth missing